The Ergolz is the main river  in the canton of Basel-Landschaft, Switzerland. It rises on Mount Geisflue in the Faltenjura mountains in the upper region of Basel-Landschaft, on the border with Aargau and Solothurn, and joins the Rhine at Augst.

Numerical data 

Since 1934 the water level and discharge of the Ergolz have been measured at Liestal.

History 
The river supplied drinking water to the Roman city of Augusta Raurica.  To this end, an aqueduct was constructed, which began upstream of today's Liestal.  Parts of the aqueduct still stand today.  Two places where the aqueduct can be visited and walked today, are in the Heidenloch district of Liestal and north-east of the sewage treatment plant in Füllinsdorf.

The Ergolz was increasingly polluted during the first half of the 20th century.  From 1960 onwards, pollution was countered by the construction of sewage treatment plants.

External links 

Measurement data of the Federal Office for the Environment from 2006  (PDF; 55 kB)

Water in the Jura mountains 

Rivers of Switzerland
Rivers of Basel-Landschaft